Locust Hill is a historic home and farm complex located near Hurt, Pittsylvania County, Virginia. The house was built in two sections with the main section built in 1861, and expanded with a three-story rear ell in 1930.  The original section is a -story, three bay, frame dwelling in the Swiss Gothic style.  It has a steeply pitched gable roof that incorporates two central chimneys and four gable ends decorated in ornamental bargeboard.  Also on the property are a number of contributing resources including a tavern, a servants' quarter, a kitchen, an icehouse, a chicken house, a smoke house, a dairy, a servants' quarter, a caretaker's house, a grist mill, a dam, a family cemetery, and the ruins of an 18th-century house.

It was listed on the National Register of Historic Places in 2002.

References

Houses on the National Register of Historic Places in Virginia
Farms on the National Register of Historic Places in Virginia
Gothic Revival architecture in Virginia
Houses completed in 1861
Houses in Pittsylvania County, Virginia
National Register of Historic Places in Pittsylvania County, Virginia
1861 establishments in Virginia